General elections are expected to be held in Niue in 2023.

Electoral system
The 20 members of the Assembly are elected by two methods; 14 are elected from single-member consistencies and six are elected from a single nationwide constituency. Both types of seat use first-past-the-post voting.

References

Elections in Niue
General election
Niue